The 1996 NCAA men's volleyball tournament was the 27th annual tournament to determine the national champion of NCAA men's collegiate volleyball. The single elimination tournament was played at Pauley Pavilion in Los Angeles, California during May 1996.

UCLA defeated Hawaiʻi in the final match, 3–2 (15–13, 12–15, 9–15, 17–15, 15–12), to win their sixteenth, and second consecutive national title. The Bruins (26–5) were coached by Al Scates.

Hawaiʻi's Yuval Katz was named the tournament's Most Outstanding Player. Katz, along with five other players, comprised the All-Tournament Team. This was the first time the Most Outstanding Player did not come from the championship team.

Qualification
Until the creation of the NCAA Men's Division III Volleyball Championship in 2012, there was only a single national championship for men's volleyball. As such, all NCAA men's volleyball programs, whether from Division I, Division II, or Division III, were eligible. A total of 4 teams were invited to contest this championship. For the first time, a third place match was not held.

Tournament bracket 
Site: Pauley Pavilion, Los Angeles, California

All tournament team 
 Yuval Katz, Hawaiʻi (Most outstanding player)
Stein Metzger, UCLA
Tom Stillwell, UCLA
Aaron Wilton, Hawaiʻi
Jason Ring, Hawaiʻi
Kevin Hourican, Penn State

See also 
 NCAA Men's National Collegiate Volleyball Championship
 NCAA Women's Volleyball Championships (Division I, Division II, Division III)

References

1996
NCAA Men's Volleyball Championship
NCAA Men's Volleyball Championship
1996 in sports in California
Volleyball in California